Dravosburg /draːˈvoze:burg/ is a borough in Allegheny County, Pennsylvania, United States, and is part of the Pittsburgh Metro Area. The population was 1,612 at the 2020 census. Dravosburg is located along the Monongahela River.

History
A post office called Dravosburg(h) has been in operation since 1862. The borough was named for John F. Dravo, a mine owner.

Geography
Dravosburg is located at  (40.350219, -79.889391).

Dravosburg is bounded on the north, west and south by West Mifflin. To the east is the Monongahela River and the city of McKeesport. The cities of Duquesne and Clairton are also nearby.

Surrounding and adjacent neighborhoods
By land, Dravosburg is entirely surrounded by West Mifflin.  Across the Monongahela River to the east, Dravosburg runs adjacent with McKeesport and Glassport, both boroughs sharing a direct connector via Mansfield Bridge.

Government and politics

Emergency services 
Law enforcement and emergency medical services are contracted to the McKeesport Police Department and McKeesport Ambulance Rescue Service respectively. Dravosburg is served by its own volunteer fire department.

Demographics

As of the census of 2000, there were 2,015 people, 948 households, and 563 families residing in the borough. The population density was 1,981.8 people per square mile (762.7/km2). There were 1,021 housing units at an average density of 1,004.2 per square mile (386.5/km2). The racial makeup of the borough was 98.71% White, 0.50% African American, 0.25% Native American, 0.25% from other races, and 0.30% from two or more races. Hispanic or Latino of any race were 0.60% of the population.

There were 948 households, out of which 22.6% had children under the age of 18 living with them, 47.0% were married couples living together, 9.6% had a female householder with no husband present, and 40.6% were non-families. 36.8% of all households were made up of individuals, and 18.6% had someone living alone who was 65 years of age or older. The average household size was 2.13 and the average family size was 2.77.

In the borough the population was spread out, with 18.5% under the age of 18, 7.2% from 18 to 24, 28.0% from 25 to 44, 26.6% from 45 to 64, and 19.7% who were 65 years of age or older. The median age was 42 years. For every 100 females, there were 84.0 males. For every 100 females age 18 and over, there were 83.3 males.

The median income for a household in the borough was $30,461, and the median income for a family was $39,663. Males had a median income of $30,435 versus $22,232 for females. The per capita income for the borough was $17,264. About 7.5% of families and 12.6% of the population were below the poverty line, including 17.7% of those under age 18 and 8.4% of those age 65 or over.

References

External links

Populated places established in 1903
Pittsburgh metropolitan area
Boroughs in Allegheny County, Pennsylvania
Pennsylvania populated places on the Monongahela River
1903 establishments in Pennsylvania